Brian Michael Fitzgerald (born December 26, 1974) is a former Major League Baseball relief pitcher who played for the Seattle Mariners in . In 6 games, he had an 8.53 ERA and 3 strikeouts. On August 12, 2002, he was claimed off waivers by the Colorado Rockies.

External links
Baseball-Reference

1976 births
Living people
Baseball players from Virginia
Major League Baseball pitchers
Everett AquaSox players
Lancaster JetHawks players
Orlando Rays players
New Haven Ravens players
San Antonio Missions players
Seattle Mariners players
Tacoma Rainiers players
Colorado Springs Sky Sox players
Virginia Tech Hokies baseball players
People from Woodbridge, Virginia